Captain Gerald Edward Ian Maitland-Carew CVO (born 28 December 1941) is a former Lord Lieutenant of Roxburgh, Ettrick and Lauderdale in Scotland. He served from March 2007 until December 2016, prior to which he was Deputy Lieutenant, from 1989 to 2007.

Maitland-Carew was born into an Anglo-Irish aristocratic family, being the second son of The 6th Baron Carew by his Scottish spouse, Lady Sylvia Gwendoline Maitland, daughter of The 15th Earl of Lauderdale. His father, Lord Carew, was the owner of Castletown House in Celbridge, County Kildare, which is possibly the largest country house still standing (and not a ruin) anywhere in Ireland. As the Maitland's male entail had been broken, he inherited Thirlestane Castle through his mother, in 1971, when he also assumed the new surname of Maitland-Carew by Deed Poll. He is now trustee of both the Thirlestane Castle and Mellerstain House Charitable Trusts.

Educated at Harrow School, he served in the 15th/19th The King's Royal Hussars, reaching the rank of Captain. He is today a member of the Territorial Army Committee, and is a Brigadier of the Royal Company of Archers.

Maitland-Carew was chairman of the Lauderdale and Gala Water Branch of the Royal British Legion Scotland between 1974 and 2004, of Musselburgh Racecourse between 1988 and 1998 as well as of the Gurkha Welfare Trust in Scotland between 1996 and 2003. For the International League for Protection of Horses, he was first chairman from 1999 to 2006, and is for a short time its vice-president. Since 1982, Maitland-Carew is chairman and also host of the Scottish Horse Trials Championships at Thirlestane Castle, and since 1989 has been a member of the Jockey Club.

He was appointed Commander of the Royal Victorian Order (CVO) in the 2016 Birthday Honours.

He is married with two sons and a daughter.

Footnotes

References

 Mosley, Charles, editor, Burke's Peerage and Baronetage, 106th edition, 1999, Crans, Switzerland, vol. 1, p. 496. 

Living people
1941 births
People educated at Harrow School
15th/19th The King's Royal Hussars officers
Lord-Lieutenants of Roxburgh, Ettrick and Lauderdale
Members of the Royal Company of Archers
Commanders of the Royal Victorian Order
Younger sons of barons